Alfred or Alf Wood may refer to:
Alfred Wood (historian) (1896–1968), British professor of modern history
Alfred Wood (cricketer) (1866–1941), English cricketer
Alfred Wood (footballer) (1879–?), English professional footballer who played as a centre forward
Alf Wood (footballer, born 1876) (1876–1919), English footballer
Alf Wood (footballer, born 1915) (1915–2001), English goalkeeper and football manager
Alf Wood (footballer, born 1945) (1945–2020), English footballer
Alf Wood (rugby) (1883–1963), rugby union and rugby league footballer of the 1900s and 1910s for England (RU), Gloucester, Great Britain (RL), England, and Oldham
Alf Wood (Australian footballer) (1875–1945), Australian rules footballer 
Alfred M. Wood (1825–1895), officer in the Union Army during the American Civil War